Tarkowski (feminine: Tarkowska; plural: Tarkowscy) is a Polish surname. Notable people with this surname include:
 Andrzej Tarkowski (1933–2016), Polish embryologist
 Christine Tarkowski (born 1967), American sculptor
 Daniela Tarkowska (born 1946), Polish javelin thrower
 James Tarkowski (born 1992), English footballer

See also
 
 Tarkovsky (surname)

Polish-language surnames